Tavíkovice is a municipality and village in Znojmo District in the South Moravian Region of the Czech Republic. It has about 600 inhabitants.

Administrative parts
The village of Dobronice is an administrative part of Tavíkovice.

Notable people
Nicholas Goldschmidt (1908–2004), Canadian conductor and music director

References

Villages in Znojmo District